The Fight of My Life is the ninth Gospel album by Kirk Franklin on GospoCentric Records.

Synopsis
Produced by Franklin, James "Jazzy" Jordan, Carla Williams and Jessie Hurst, the album features songs with several urban contemporary gospel, Christian hip hop and Contemporary Christian artists including tobyMac, Rance Allen, Isaac Carree,  Doug Williams, Melvin Williams, Da’ T.R.U.T.H., and Donovan Owens. It is the 10th studio album by Franklin and his 11th North American album. The album debuted on the Billboard 200 at #33 with 74,000 copies sold in the first week.

Track listing
All tracks composed by Kirk Franklin except where noted.

Personnel

Vocalists

Nikki Ross
Anaysha Figueroa
Ashley Guilbert
Charmaine Swimpson
Eric Moore
Isaac Carree
Joy Hill
Faith Anderson
Sheri Jones-Moffett
Melonie Daniels
Candy West
Jana Bell
Melodie Davis
Myron Butler
Anthony Evans
Deonis Cook
Ryan Edgar

Musicians

Kirk Franklin – keyboards, programming, piano, claps
Shaun Martin – keyboards, programming, piano, drums, percussion, claps, vocals
Robert "Sput" Searight – drums
Jerome Harmon – keyboards, Hammond B3, programming
Doc Powell – lead guitar, Acoustic guitar
Jonathan David Wyatt – keyboards, Hammond B3
Ayron Lewis – Hammond B3
Tre Nagella – drum programming, guitar
Rodney Lawson – lead guitar
Keith Taylor – bass guitar
Pablo Batista – percussion
Terry Baker – drums, percussion
Brian Haley – drums
Todd Lawton – bass guitar
Tim Rosenau – lead guitar
Ernie G – DJ
Todd Parsnow – lead guitar
Braylon Lacy – Upright bass guitar
Ric Robbins – DJ
Lloyd Barry – trumpet
Vinnie Ciesielski – trumpet
Roy Agee – trombone
Joe Johnson – saxophone
Doug Moffet – saxophone
Matt Cappy – trumpet
Carl Cox – saxophone
Jeff Bradshaw – trombone

Orchestra

Emma Kummrow – violin
Igor Szwec – violin
Olga Konopelsky – violin
Ghislaine Fleischmann – violin
Charles Parker – violin
Gregory Teperman – violin
Luigi Mazzocchi – violin
Robert Martin – violin
H.S. Alexandra Leem – viola
Peter Nocella – viola
Jennie Lorenzo – cello

Charts

Weekly charts

Year-end charts

Single

Certifications

Accolades

Wins
 40th GMA Dove Awards: Urban Album of the Year
 51st Grammy Awards: Best Contemporary R&B Gospel Album
 51st Grammy Awards: Best Gospel Song ("Help Me Believe")

Nominations
 40th GMA Dove Awards: Urban Recorded Song of the Year ("Declaration (This Is It)")

References

2007 albums
Kirk Franklin albums